The Historical Aircraft Corporation was an American aircraft manufacturer based in Nucla, Colorado. The company specialized in the design and manufacture of kit aircraft that were scale replicas of Second World War and vintage aircraft.

Construction techniques used in the company's products included welded 4130 steel fuselage frames covered in either doped aircraft fabric or in a shell of polyurethane foam and fiberglass.

The company is no longer in business.

Aircraft

References

Defunct aircraft manufacturers of the United States
Replica aircraft manufacturers
Homebuilt aircraft